Oro y plata (Spanish for "gold and silver") could refer to: 

Gold and Silver, a 1934 Mexican film 
The state motto of Montana

See also
Silver and Gold (disambiguation)